Instablog9ja is a Nigerian news and gossip blog publishing on Instagram and its primary website. Founded in 2014, Instablog9ja features a mix of news, and carries mainly Nigerian focused soft news and entertainment gossip. As of August 2022, Intsablog9ja Instagram handle had over 5.2 million followers, and over 1.4 million followers on Twitter. The blog is noted for its critical interpretation of issues, reporting about celebrities and its story captions often considered negative and attacking. On 12 April 2017, Nigerian hip hop singer Davido made a post on his twitter handle accusing Instablog9ja of writing negative stories about him and told the blog to stop writing about him "good or bad".

Awards

Ownership controversy 
The publisher of the blog remains unknown and has often generated controversy among its followers and celebrities. In November 2019, Linda Ikeji's blog published an exclusive story in which it identified certain John Abayomi, an online editor of the The Punch as the publisher of Instablog9ja but this claim turned out to be false. On 25 August 2020, Instablog9ja official Instagram handle went live showing the face of a lady who shouted "Jesus" multiple times for the ten seconds live broadcast. Its followers who were active during the ten seconds live broadcast grabbed screenshots of the moment believing that the lady is the owner of the blog. The screengrab of the lady trended on social media for days but with mixed reactions among its followers and music artists including Davido, Naira Marley and Peruzzi. While some believed that the lady was the owner of the blog and threatened to attack her, others commented that she was only a handler of the Instagram handle. Naira Marley described threats against the supposed owner of the blog as empty but also advised that if she was scared, she should hire private guards. Instablog9ja has never given its official position as to who the publisher of the blog is.

References 

2015 establishments in Nigeria
Online newspapers published in Nigeria
Mass media in Nigeria
English-language newspapers published in Africa